The Rhodesia Medal was initiated by the British Government in consultation with Australia, New Zealand, Fiji and Kenya, whose forces took part in Operation AGILA (Operation MIDFORD for the New Zealand forces). The role of the multi-national force was to keep peace between 22,000 guerrilla fighters and the Rhodesian forces during the ceasefire and run-up to the 1980 elections.

Each country treats the medal as part of its own honours system.

Qualification
The medal was awarded for service of at least 14 days between 1 December 1979 and 20 March 1980, to members of the military and police forces, as well as eligible civilians, who participated in monitoring the ceasefire and supervising the elections in the lead-up to Zimbabwean independence. There was no minimum qualifying period for those killed, wounded or disabled due to service, or where a recipient was decorated for gallantry.

Recipients of the Rhodesia Medal also received the Zimbabwean Independence Medal in either silver or bronze, although British personnel did not have permission to wear it in uniform, while New Zealand granted approval for restricted wear only.

Description
Issued by the Royal Mint, the Rhodesia Medal had the following design:
 It is circular, made of rhodium-plated cupro-nickel and 36 mm in diameter.
 The obverse features the crowned effigy of Queen Elizabeth II with the inscription 'ELIZABETH II DEL GRATIA REGINA FID.DEF'.
 The reverse depicts a sable antelope surrounded by the inscription 'THE RHODESIA MEDAL' and '1980'.
 The medal was issued named to British armed forces personnel, but unnamed to police officers.
 The medal is suspended from a 32 mm sky-blue ribbon with three central stripes of red, white and blue.
 No clasps were awarded.

Precedence

See also
Australian campaign medals
British campaign medals
New Zealand campaign medals

References

External links
It's an Honour - Australian Government site, the Rhodesia Medal
ADF Honours and Awards since 1975
NZDF Medals
Rhodesia Medal Regulations

British campaign medals
Australian campaign medals
New Zealand campaign medals
Rhodesia
History of Zimbabwe
Awards established in 1980